Embach may refer to:

Geography
Places
Embach, Austria, mountain village near Salzburg
Embach, Germany, villages in Bavaria, Germany:
Embach in Dorfen, Erding, Upper Bavaria
Embach in Siegsdorf, Traunstein, Upper Bavaria
Embach in Malgersdorf, Rottal-Inn, Lower Bavaria
Embach in Obertraubling, Regensburg, Upper Palatinate

Rivers
Emajõgi, river in Estonia, previously known as Embach in German
Väike Emajõgi, river in Estonia, previously known as Kleiner Embach in German
Velikaya River, river in Russia, also known as Pleskau Embach in German

People with the surname
Carsten Embach (born 1968), German bobsledder